The Lattimer massacre was the violent deaths of at least 19 unarmed striking immigrant anthracite miners at the Lattimer mine near Hazleton, Pennsylvania, United States, on September 10, 1897. The miners, mostly of Polish, Slovak, Lithuanian and German ethnicity, were shot and killed by a Luzerne County sheriff's posse. Scores more workers were wounded. The massacre was a turning point in the history of the United Mine Workers (UMW).

Background
The economies of Central and Eastern Europe were struggling in the late 19th century. The European rural population was growing faster than either the agricultural or new industrial sectors of the economy could absorb, industrialization was disrupting both the agricultural and craft economy, and there was increasing competition from large-scale commercial and foreign agricultural producers. These factors drove most of the mass immigration to the US. Disproportionate numbers of new Slavic immigrants worked in the coal mining industry, where they were among the most exploited of all mine workers. During strikes in Northeast Pennsylvania by English-speaking miners in 1875 and 1887, many Slavic miners were imported as strikebreakers, and were "despised as scabs" by the English-speaking immigrant and American miners of the region.

Conditions in coal mines of the late 19th century were harsh.  Mine safety was poor, such that 32,000 miners in Northeast Pennsylvania had died since 1870. Wages, already low in a competitive industry, fell 17% during the mid-1890s after a coal industry slump. Although wages had improved some by the fall of 1897, anthracite coal companies in the region cut wages and consolidated operations within the mines (often resulting in more laborious working conditions). In some cases, companies forced workers to lease homes from the company and required them to see only company doctors when injured.

Events

Strike

In August 1897, the Honey Brook division of the Lehigh and Wilkes-Barre Coal Company laid off workers at its strip mines, cut the pay of the remaining employees, and raised fees for workers residing in the area's company towns. The company consolidated its mule stables, forcing teenage mule drivers to travel much farther each day to pick up their mules (time for which they were not compensated). After inconclusive talks, 25 to 35 teenaged drivers struck on August 14, 1897. A scuffle between a supervisor and some drivers led to additional walkouts by strip miners as well as underground coal miners, and by August 16 nearly 2,000 workers were on strike. Nearly all the miners joined the UMW (United Mine Workers) on August 18, and within two days almost all the mines in the region had closed due to the spreading strike. Many Slavic miners had not joined the nascent United Mine Workers, both because of ethnic discrimination exhibited by English-speaking and American miners but also because of the poor relationships between unionized miners and the former strikebreakers. But worsening working conditions and a UMW call for a 15 percent wage increase drew many Slavic miners into the union.

The first wave of the strike ended on August 23, after the company agreed to pay overtime, bring wages up to the regional average, allow miners to see their own doctors when injured, and no longer force miners to live in company-owned housing. A second strike began on August 25. Teenaged breaker boys at the A.S. Van Wickle coal breaker in the nearby village of Colerain struck for higher wages as well. When Van Wickle attempted to use Slavic workers as strikebreakers, the Slavs joined the strike instead. Although the strike spread to two other nearby coal works, the company quickly agreed to raise wages up to the regional average and the strike ended on or about August 28.

But when the new pay rates were announced on September 1, only a limited number of workers received raises. Management did agree to treat Slavic workers more fairly, but the mine owners reneged on their other promises. The strikes resumed. On September 3, 3,000 workers marched on four mines, shutting them down.

The mine owners' private armed force, the Coal and Iron Police, proved too few in number to break the strike, so the owners appealed for help from Luzerne County Sheriff James F. Martin. Martin established a posse of about 100 English and Irish citizens to prevent any further marches from occurring. Within five days, 8,000 to 10,000 miners were on strike. On September 8, mine owners demanded that the sheriff of Schuylkill County arrest several thousand miners who had assembled near Pottsville and had forced a mine to shut down, but the sheriff refused.

Massacre

On Friday, September 10, about 300 to 400 unarmed strikers—nearly all of them Slavs and Germans—marched to a coal mine owned by Calvin Pardee at the town of Lattimer to support a newly formed UMW union. Their goal was to support the newly formed UMW union at the still-open Lattimer mine. The demonstrators were confronted by law enforcement officials several times on the road and ordered to disperse, but kept marching.

The deputies had spent most of the morning joking about how many miners they would kill. While on a streetcar headed for Lattimer with the sheriff and his comrades, one deputy was overheard saying "I bet I drop six of them when I get over there."

When the demonstrators reached Lattimer at 3:45 pm, they were met again by the sheriff and 150 armed deputies. Sheriff Martin ordered the marchers to disperse, and then attempted to grab an American flag out of the hands of the lead marcher. A scuffle ensued, and the police opened fire on the unarmed crowd. At least 19 miners died, and anywhere from 17 to 49 others were wounded. Many had been shot in the back, and several had multiple gunshot wounds, which indicated that they had been targeted by the deputies.

Aftermath
The strike led to temporary mass unrest in the area.  After Sheriff Martin telephoned for help, the Pennsylvania National Guard was dispatched to the county to restore order. Late on the evening of September 10, more than 2,500 troops of the Third Brigade (partly stationed in Luzerne County) had been deployed. Local Slavic community leaders held a rally on September 11 to try to calm the workers, raise money for the provision of the families, and seek the prosecution of Sheriff Martin and his deputies. Outraged miners searched in vain on September 12 for Lehigh and Wilkes-Barre Coal Company mine superintendent Gomer Jones, and destroyed his home when they could not find him. On September 20, a group of Slavic women (armed with fireplace pokers and rolling pins) led some 150 men and boys to shut down the McAdoo coal works, but were turned back by the quick arrival of National Guard troops. The Guard's artillery unit was withdrawn on September 24, and the rest of the troops five days later.

Sheriff Martin and 73 deputies were arrested and put on trial. At trial, the defendants claimed that the marchers had refused to obey an order to disperse and were charging toward the sheriff and his deputies.  As recounted by witness John Pusti in formal testimony:

Further medical evidence showed that nearly all the strikers had been shot in the back. Nonetheless, the sheriff and his deputies were acquitted.

The Lattimer massacre was a turning point in the history of the United Mine Workers (UMW). The UMW, struggling to establish itself in Pennsylvania's coal mines, witnessed a dramatic upsurge of more than 10,000 new members.  The incident helped end a longstanding myth about the docility of non-English speaking miners. Just three years later, the union was powerful enough to win large wage increases and safety improvements for miners throughout the region. It significantly boosted the union career of John Mitchell, an activist for the UMW who would be elected president of the national union due to his efforts during the Lattimer strikes.

The crossroads where the Lattimer massacre occurred remained unmarked for 80 years.  In 1972, the United Labor Council of Lower Luzerne and Carbon Counties and the UMW erected a small memorial on the site.

List of victims

According to a contemporary report in the New York Herald, there were 21 killed in the Lattimer massacre:

 Michael Cheslock (Ceslak); only miner who was a U.S. naturalized citizen
 Sebastian Bozestoski, age 35
 John Chobonshi, age 23
 Adalbert Czaja, age 27
 John Futa, age 29
 John Gastack, age 32
 Antonio Grazke, age 33
 Frank Kodel, age 24
 Andrew Kollick, age 30
 Andre Nikzkowuski, age 27
 Rulof Rekenits, age 35
 John Ruski, age 28
 John Sheka, age 27
 John Tranke, age 32
 John Turnasdich, age 27
 Stephen Urich, age 27
 Andrew Varicku, age 28
 Andrew Yerkman, age 31
 Stanley Zagorski, age 45
 Adam Zamoski, age 26
 Andrew Zeminski, age 31
 John Zernovick, age 33

Working from what he describes as "known gravesites" rather than contemporary documents, in his book The Guns of Lattimer self-described "philosopher and theologian rather than a historian" Michael Novak lists the following 19 names of Lattimer shooting victims:

 Broztowski
 Čzaja
 Česlak
 Chrzeszeski
 Futa
 Grekoš
 Jurić
 Jurašek
 Kulik
 Mieczkowski
 Monikaski
 Platek
 Rekewicz
 Skrep
 Tarnowicz
 Tomašantas
 Zagorski
 Ziominski
 Ziemba

See also

 List of worker deaths in United States labor disputes
 List of incidents of civil unrest in the United States

Footnotes

Further reading

 M. Mark Stolarik, "A Slovak Perspective on the Lattimer Massacre," Pennsylvania History, vol. 69, no. 1 (Winter 2002), pp. 31–41.
 "Blood Flows at Lattimer," Scranton Republican, Sept. 11, 1897, pg. 1.
 "Strikers Fired Upon," Hazelton Sentinel, Sept. 10, 1897, pg. 5.

External links
 The Summit Times: Lattimer: A Time to Remember
 Congressional Record :100th Anniversary of the Lattimer Mine Disaster

1897 labor disputes and strikes
Massacres in 1897
Political repression in the United States
Scranton–Wilkes-Barre metropolitan area
1897 in Pennsylvania
Labor disputes led by the United Mine Workers of America
Anthracite Coal Region of Pennsylvania
Protest-related deaths
Massacres in the United States
Labor-related violence in the United States
Coal Wars
Hazleton, Pennsylvania
Police brutality in the United States
Riots and civil disorder in Pennsylvania
Labor disputes in Pennsylvania
September 1897 events
Mass murder in 1897
1897 murders in the United States
Miners' labor disputes in the United States